The 1976 Toronto Argonauts finished in fourth place in the Eastern Conference with a 7–8–1 record and failed to make the playoffs.

Offseason

Regular season

Standings

Schedule

Awards and honors
Granville Liggins, James P. McCaffrey Trophy

References

Toronto Argonauts seasons
1976 Canadian Football League season by team